Rockland is a city in Knox County, Maine, in the United States. As of the 2020 census, the town population was 6,936. It is the county seat of Knox County. The city is a popular tourist destination. It is a departure point for the Maine State Ferry Service to the islands of Penobscot Bay: Vinalhaven, North Haven and Matinicus.

History

Abenaki Indigenous People called it Catawamteak, meaning "great landing place." In 1767, John Lermond and his two brothers from Warren built a camp to produce oak staves and pine lumber. Thereafter known as Lermond's Cove, it was first settled about 1769. When in 1777 Thomaston was incorporated, Lermond's Cove became a district called Shore village. On July 28, 1848, it was set off as the town of East Thomaston. Renamed Rockland in 1850, it was chartered as a city in 1854.

Rockland developed rapidly because of shipbuilding and lime production. In 1854 alone, the city built eleven ships, three barks, six brigs and four schooners. The city had twelve lime quarries and 125 lime kilns, with upwards of 300 vessels to transport the mineral to various ports in the country.

In March 1877, the Granite Cutters' International Union was formed in Rockland. It was one of the earliest craft unions in the United States and formed among the region's growing granite industry.

By 1886, shipbuilding was surpassed by the lime business, which had twelve manufacturers employing 1,000 workers. Nevertheless, Rockland had three or more shipyards, a marine railway, five sail lofts and two boatbuilders. Other industries included three grain mills, two foundries, three carriage factories, six lumber mills, two machine shops, three cooperies, one tannery, four granite and marble works, two boot and shoe factories, and four printing offices. Fishing was also important. Fleets of Friendship Sloops sailed between the harbor and fishing grounds across Penobscot Bay.

The opening of the Knox and Lincoln Railroad in 1871 brought an influx of tourists. Inns and hotels were established to accommodate them, with the grandest being The Bay Point Hotel in 1889. With a commanding view near the breakwater, the resort offered every luxury and amusement. Renamed The Samoset Hotel in 1902, it was successful until the Great Depression, which began a slow decline. In the age of automobiles, travelers were no longer restricted to the limits of train service, but were free to explore elsewhere. Closed in 1969, the Victorian hotel burned in 1972. A new Samoset Resort opened in 1974.

In 1915, the new superdreadnought  conducted tests and completed her running trials just off the shore from Rockland.

Today, Rockland is an officially designated micropolitan area. Since the early 1990s, Rockland has seen a shift in its economy away from the fishery and toward a service center city. It has also seen a substantial increase in tourism and the downtown has transformed into one of unique shops, boutiques, fine dining and art galleries. Rockland is the commercial center of the midcoast Maine region, with many historic inns, a coffee roaster, a food co-op, a community radio station WRFR-LP, the Farnsworth Art Museum and the Center for Maine Contemporary Art (CMCA). Rockland was named a Coast Guard City in March 2008, in recognition of the long-standing and special relationship that the city and its residents have with the United States Coast Guard. On March 13, 2017, the Rockland City Council approved a resolve to support community diversity.

Geography
Rockland is located on Penobscot Bay and the Gulf of Maine, part of the Atlantic Ocean. About ten miles to the east are the islands of North Haven and Vinalhaven, reached by ferry from Rockland.

Rockland is crossed by U.S. 1 and 1A, and state routes 17, 73 and 90. It borders the towns of Owls Head to the southeast, Thomaston to the southwest, Warren to the northwest, and Rockport to the northeast.

Climate

The coldest month is January and the warmest month is July.

Demographics

2010 census
As of the census of 2010, there were 7,297 people, 3,423 households, and 1,744 families living in the city. The racial makeup of the city was 95.8% White, 0.6% African American, 0.4% Native American, 0.7% Asian, 0.1% Pacific Islander, 0.2% from other races, and 2.2% from two or more races. Hispanic or Latino of any race were 1.3% of the population.

There were 3,423 households, of which 23.1% had children under the age of 18 living with them, 34.2% were married couples living together, 12.6% had a female householder with no husband present, 4.2% had a male householder with no wife present, and 49.1% were non-families. 40.0% of all households were made up of individuals, and 17.4% had someone living alone who was 65 years of age or older. The average household size was 2.06 and the average family size was 2.73.

The median age in the city was 43.5 years. 18.3% of residents were under the age of 18; 8.7% were between the ages of 18 and 24; 24.8% were from 25 to 44; 28.5% were from 45 to 64; and 19.7% were 65 years of age or older. The gender makeup of the city was 46.5% male and 53.5% female.

2000 census
As of the census of 2000, there were 7,609 people, 3,434 households, and 1,943 families living in the city. The racial makeup of the city was 97.90% White, 0.25% African American, 0.24% Native American, 0.57% Asian, 0.03% Pacific Islander, 0.11% from other races, and 0.92% from two or more races. Hispanic or Latino of any race were 0.57% of the population.

There were 3,434 households, out of which 25.2% had children under the age of 18 living with them, 40.4% were married couples living together, 12.9% had a female householder with no husband present, and 43.4% were non-families. 36.3% of all households were made up of individuals, and 16.2% had someone living alone who was 65 years of age or older. The average household size was 2.15 and the average family size was 2.78.

In the city, the population was spread out, with 21.1% under the age of 18, 8.2% from 18 to 24, 27.3% from 25 to 44, 23.8% from 45 to 64, and 19.5% who were 65 years of age or older. The median age was 41 years. For every 100 females, there were 85.6 males. For every 100 females age 18 and over, there were 83.1 males.

The median income for a household in the city was $30,209, and the median income for a family was $37,083. Males had a median income of $27,212 versus $20,708 for females. The per capita income for the city was $16,659. About 10.4% of families and 14.7% of the population were below the poverty line, including 22.2% of those under age 18 and 8.2% of those age 65 or over.

Voter registration

Arts and culture

Attractions
Rockland is home to the Maine Lobster Festival, a celebration held annually in honor of the town's primary export: lobster. In the first week of August, thousands of people come from all over the world to participate in this five-day event. Rockland also is home to the Center for Maine Contemporary Art, designed by internationally recognized architect Toshiko Mori, and the Farnsworth Art Museum, a world-famous art museum containing paintings by Andrew Wyeth and other well-known New England artists. Rockland's main street also features numerous small shops and businesses including coffee shops, book stores, art supply stores, restaurants, organic markets, computer repair and toy stores. Penobscot Bay, which Rockland borders, is known internationally as one of the best recreational sailing grounds in the world. The city's breakwater, built in the 19th century, also draws tourists.

Sites of interest

 Rockland Public Library
 Farnsworth Art Museum
 Center for Maine Contemporary Art
 Lincoln Street Center for Arts and Education
 Maine Lighthouse Museum
 Maine Eastern Railroad
 Maine Lobster Festival
 North Atlantic Blues Festival
 Rockland Breakwater Light
 Rockland Historical Society and Museum
 Maine Boats, Homes, and Harbors Show
 University College at Rockland
 The Coastal Children's Museum

Education
 Oceanside High School-East
 The Watershed School
 The Apprenticeshop
 Coastal Senior College
 Mid-Coast School of Technology
 Penobscot School
 UMA Rockland Center (formerly University College at Rockland)

Infrastructure

Transportation
U.S. Route 1 passes through the county from the west and to the north. Maine State Route 17 goes north from the town, and Maine State Route 73 goes from the town, to the peninsula to the south.

The Maine State Ferry Service operates three ferry routes out of Rockland Ferry Terminal. There are multiple departures per day to Vinalhaven and North Haven, while ferries to Matinicus depart less regularly. Intercity buses operated by Concord Coach Lines also stop at the ferry terminal, with service to Boston, Portland, Brunswick, Bangor, and other nearby towns.

Rail

Until 1958, the Rockland was the terminus for Maine Central Railroad passenger trains from Portland, along the Rockland Branch from Brunswick. The Maine Central Railroad ran three trains a day on the days besides Sunday and fewer trains on Sunday. In Portland's Union Station, these trains made connections to trains to Boston, New York City, Bangor and the Canadian Maritimes. In the final months, service diminished to one daily except Sunday trip in each direction, until finally discontinuing on April 4, 1959.

From 2003 to 2015, the Maine Eastern Railroad offered seasonal excursion service to Rockland, Maine which connected to Amtrak's Downeaster at Brunswick. In October 2017, the Northern New England Passenger Rail Authority announced plans to extend one weekend Downeaster round trip to Rockland between Memorial Day and Labor Day beginning in 2018. Intermediate stops would be made at Bath, Wiscasset, and Newcastle. As part of preparation, Amtrak, along with the Northern New England Passenger Rail Authority, Maine Department of Transportation and the Central Maine and & Quebec Railroad, made a test run of a train on August 14.

Notable people 

 Adelbert Ames, Civil War general, senator and the 27th governor of Mississippi
 Hiram George Berry, Civil War general and first commander of 4th Maine Volunteer Infantry Regiment
 Alton H. Blackington, feature journalist, photojournalist and chronicler of New England; born in Rockland
 William T. Cobb, 46th governor of Maine
 Samuel Collins, Jr., state senator and Associate Justice of the Maine Supreme Judicial Court
 Leo Connellan, poet
 Gertrude Elliott, actress
 Maxine Elliott, actress
 David F. Emery, US congressman
 Nathan A. Farwell, US senator
 Samuel C. Fessenden, served in the 37th U. S. Congress, lived and served as a judge in Rockland
 Todd Field, Academy Award-nominated filmmaker
 Obadiah Gardner, US senator
 Bo Goldman, screenwriter and playwright
 Edward Sturgis Ingraham, educator, publisher, mountaineer, learned printing trade in Rockland
 Isaac Smith Kalloch, mayor of San Francisco
 Charles E. Littlefield, US congressman
 Theodore E. Long, former president of Elizabethtown College
 Herbert Lord, director of the United States Bureau of the Budget and awarded the Distinguished Service Medal; born in Rockland
 Samizu Matsuki, artist and educator
 Edward Mazurek, state senator
 Edna St. Vincent Millay, Pulitzer Prize–winning poet
 Edward C. Moran Jr., US Representative
 Louise Nevelson, artist, emigrated from Russia to Rockland as a child
 Edward Lawry Norton, electrical engineer who developed the Norton equivalent circuit, born in Rockland
 Walter Piston, Pulitzer Prize–winning composer
 Robert B. Rheault, former commander of all Special Forces in Vietnam
 Alice Marion Shaw, composer and pianist born in Rockland
 Carrie Burpee Shaw, composer and educator born in Rockland
 Charles Wilbert Snow, educator, poet, college professor, Governonr of Connecticut, author of Codline's Child, born and summered in the Rockland area
 James Breckenridge Speed, businessman and philanthropist, summered and died in Rockland

References

External links

 City of Rockland, Maine

 
Micropolitan areas of Maine
County seats in Maine
Cities in Maine
Populated places established in 1769
Cities in Knox County, Maine
Populated coastal places in Maine